Aaron Yates may refer to:

 Tech N9ne (Aaron Yates, born 1971), American rapper
 Aaron Yates (motorcycle racer) (born 1973), American motorcycle racer